Rimbachia is a species of fungus in the family Tricholomataceae, and the type species of the genus Rimbachia. It was first described scientifically by the French mycologist Narcisse Théophile Patouillard in 1891.

Description
The fruit bodies of Rimbachia paradoxa are somewhat flattened, with the cap is attached to the stem at an angle, and the spore-bearing surface (the hymenium) is reticulate and gill-like. The fruit bodies are saprobic, growing on dead wood.

References

External links

Tricholomataceae
Fungi described in 1891
Fungi of Europe